Denis Alekseyevich Shepilov (born 17 November 2000) is a Russian football player. He plays for FC Fakel Voronezh.

Club career
He made his debut in the Russian Football National League for FC Fakel Voronezh on 28 October 2020 in a game against FC Volgar Astrakhan.

Career statistics

References

External links
 Profile by Russian Football National League
 

2000 births
Living people
Russian footballers
Association football midfielders
FC Fakel Voronezh players
Russian First League players
Russian Second League players